Cass Township is one of twelve townships in White County, Indiana, United States. As of the 2010 census, its population was 585 and it contained 228 housing units.

Cass Township was established in 1848. The township was named for Gen. Lewis Cass, Governor of Michigan Territory.

Geography

Unincorporated towns
 Bell Center at 
 Headlee at 
(This list is based on USGS data and may include former settlements.)

Adjacent townships
 Indian Creek Township, Pulaski County (north)
 Van Buren Township, Pulaski County (northeast)
 Boone Township, Cass County (east)
 Jefferson Township, Cass County (southeast)
 Jackson Township (south)
 Lincoln Township (south)
 Liberty Township (west)

Cemeteries
The township contains Bell Center Cemetery.

School districts
 Pioneer Regional School Corporation
 Twin Lakes School Corporation

Political districts
 Indiana's 2nd congressional district
 State House District 16
 State Senate District 07

References
 United States Census Bureau 2007 TIGER/Line Shapefiles
 United States Board on Geographic Names (GNIS)
 IndianaMap

External links
 Indiana Township Association
 United Township Association of Indiana

Townships in White County, Indiana
Townships in Indiana